The War Poets Association is a UK-based charitable organisation established in 2004. Launched at a reception in the British Embassy in Paris, in July 2004, it aims to promote interest in war poetry of the twentieth century, primarily in English. It organises regular events, has a website and publishes an annual journal.

The association is interested in all poetry of conflict written during the twentieth century.

It holds records poems with the subject World War I, World War II and Spanish Civil War and conflicts between Ireland and Northern Ireland.

The current president is Tim Kendall, Professor of English at the University of Exeter.

References
Tim Kendall, Modern English War Poetry (Oxford University Press, 2006)

External links
 War Poets Association

Poetry organizations
Arts organisations based in the United Kingdom
War poetry
Companies established in 2004